The Anson Record is an American newspaper based in Wadesboro, North Carolina, covering Anson County, N.C. The Anson Record traces its heritage back to 1881, as the Messenger and Intelligencer (and Ansonian), but the modern Anson Record was first published on Jan. 20, 1955.

The newspaper won several awards from the North Carolina Press Association in 2016 including first place in beat news reporting and arts & entertainment reporting, and additional awards for election/political reporting and city/county/government reporting.

The Record was previously owned by Heartland Publications. In 2012 Versa Capital Management merged Heartland Publications, Ohio Community Media, the former Freedom papers it had acquired, and Impressions Media into a new company, Civitas Media. Civitas Media sold its properties in the Carolinas to Champion Media in 2017.

Their mission statement is "The Anson Record seeks to provide the news the community needs, reported faithfully and fully, with respect for all and favor to none. We strive to be authoritative and insightful, to inform and to delight."

History 
The Anson Record has been in operation for 135 years. However, The Anson Record and the Messenger and Intelligencer combined in 1979. The first editor of the paper was A.D. Way Jr.

Now, it estimates that 10,500 readers refer to it for weekly news. It delivers print newspapers on Wednesdays, email reports daily, and has a website available at all times. It also conducts live streaming broadcasts around Wadesboro.

Notable Stories

Awards 
In March 2019, the Anson Record won two NC Press Association awards. Editor Alan Wooten was awarded second place in the "Editorials" category. Staff, consisting of Wooten, reporter Natalie Davis, and a design team in Lumberton won third place in the "News Coverage" category. In 2016, reporter Imari Scarborough won two awards at the NC Press Association's Editorial Contest and News Excellence Contest: first place in beat news reporting and third place in city/county government reporting.

See also
 List of newspapers in North Carolina

References

Weekly newspapers published in North Carolina
Anson County, North Carolina